Me and My Girl is a musical with music by Noel Gay and its original book and lyrics by Douglas Furber and L. Arthur Rose. The story, set in the late 1930s, tells of an unapologetically unrefined cockney gentleman named Bill Snibson, who learns that he is the 14th heir to the Earl of Hareford. The action is set in Hampshire, Mayfair, and Lambeth.

The musical had a successful original run in the West End in 1937, and was turned into a film in 1939, titled The Lambeth Walk, named after one of the show's songs. "The Lambeth Walk" was also the subject of a news story in The Times of October 1938: "While dictators rage and statesmen talk, all Europe dances – to The Lambeth Walk." The production also included the song "The Sun Has Got His Hat On".

After returning to the West End briefly in 1952, the musical's book received a revision by Stephen Fry with Mike Ockrent in the 1980s. The show was revised again and revived in the West End in 1984, where it received two Laurence Olivier Awards and ran for eight years. The same production was revived on Broadway in 1986 for a three-year run. The production won three of 11 Tony Award nominations.

Production history
Me and My Girl originally opened on the West End at the Victoria Palace Theatre on 16 December 1937 and starred Lupino Lane. Lane had previously played Bill Snibson in a horseracing comedy play, Twenty to One, that opened in 1935. Me and My Girl was conceived as a fresh vehicle for the character. At first attracting little notice, the production gained success after a matinee performance was broadcast live on BBC radio following the cancellation of a sporting event. In May 1939, a performance was televised live from the theatre, one of the first such broadcasts; it was rebroadcast that July. The original West End production ran for 1,646 performances.

The musical was revived in 1941, 1945 and 1949 in the West End. Lupino Lane starred and directed each production, with choreography by Fred Leslie. In the 1980s, the book was revised by Stephen Fry and Mike Ockrent. This version included the song "Leaning on a Lamp-post".

In 1984, another revised production opened at the Leicester Haymarket Theatre with a revised script by Fry and contributions by director Mike Ockrent. It transferred to the Adelphi Theatre on 12 February 1985 and closed on 16 January 1993 after an eight-year run and 3,303 performances. It starred Robert Lindsay as Bill Snibson, Emma Thompson as Sally Smith, and Frank Thornton as Sir John. The production won two Olivier Awards: Musical of the Year and Outstanding Performance by an Actor in a Musical (Robert Lindsay). Cast changes included Gary Wilmot, Les Dennis, Enn Reitel and Karl Howman as Bill, and Bonnie Langford, Su Pollard, Louise English, Jessica Martin and Lorraine Chase as Sally. Thornton was succeeded by Nicholas Smith and Patrick Cargill. The production subsequently toured throughout Britain.

The same production opened on Broadway at the Marquis Theatre on 10 August 1986 and closed on 31 December 1989, after 1,420 performances.  Directed by Ockrent with choreography by Gillian Gregory, the cast starred Robert Lindsay and Maryann Plunkett, with George S. Irving and Jane Connell. The production was nominated for 13 Tony Awards in 11 categories and won for Best Actor, Best Actress and Best Choreography. Jim Dale succeeded Lindsay in the lead role of Bill and Ellen Foley succeeded Plunkett as Sally. Lady Jacqueline Carstone was originated by Jane Summerhays, with subsequent performances in the role by Dee Hoty and Janet Aldrich, among others. Irving was succeeded on Broadway by Jay Garner in the role of Sir John Tremayne. Tim Curry played Bill for one year in the US tour that began in October 1987.

Numerous productions have been staged over the years across the UK. In 1997, for example, it was staged at the Royal Shakespeare Theatre for a limited run. A 70th anniversary production had an eight-month British tour during 2006, and the show also played at Sheffield Theatres in 2010.

The Shaw Festival in Niagara-on-the-Lake, Ontario, Canada, staged a production directed by Ashlie Corcoran and featuring Michael Therriault as Bill and Kristi Frank as Sally, which ran from April through October 2017. An Encores! staged concert in May 2018 starred Christian Borle and Laura Michelle Kelly as Bill and Sally. Warren Carlyle directed and choreographed. The musical was revived at Chichester Festival Theatre from July to August 2018, directed by Daniel Evans and starring Matt Lucas as Bill and Caroline Quentin as the Duchess of Deane.

Plot
Act I
In the 1930s, the Harefords, a family of haughty aristocrats, are seeking the legitimate heir to the title of Earl of Hareford. Bill Snibson, a Cockney from Lambeth is found and named as the long-lost "Earl of Hareford". It seems that the 13th Earl had secretly and briefly wed a girl from a bad neighborhood. However, Bill's rough Cockney ways do not satisfy the Will of the last Earl: in order to gain his inheritance of the title and estate, Bill must satisfy the very proper executors (Maria, Duchess of Dene, and Sir John Tremayne) by learning gentlemanly manners. The Duchess thinks that she can make Bill "fit and proper", but not his Cockney girlfriend, Sally Smith.  The Duchess plans a party in Bill's honour, but Sally is not to be invited.  Sir John tells Sally that she and Bill ought to return to Lambeth, but he is moved by Sally's heartfelt declaration of love for Bill ("Once You Lose Your Heart").

At the party, Bill puts on airs and tries to please his new-found upper-class lawyers, family and servants, but his everyman roots quickly begin to show.  Sally shows up in inappropriate garb, with her Lambeth friends, saying that she is going back to where she belongs. Bill seconds this at first, but then teaches the nobility "The Lambeth Walk".

Act II
Bill must make a speech in the House of Lords in coronet and "vermin"-trimmed peer's robes. Sally leaves, telling him to marry someone with good blood, and, in a scene inspired by Gilbert and Sullivan's Ruddigore, the portraits of Bill's ancestors awaken to remind him of his noblesse oblige. Bill and Sally have gained an ally in Sir John, who offers to help them by engaging a speech professor (implied to be Henry Higgins from Pygmalion) to help Sally impress the Duchess.

Bill constantly bemoans his separation from Sally.  Preparing another party for Bill, the Duchess realises how much Sally means to him.  This puts her in a romantic mood, and she accepts an offer of marriage from Sir John. Bill, dressed in his old outrageous Cockney clothes, declares that he's going home and goes upstairs to pack.  Just then, Sally astonishes everyone by arriving in an elegant gown and tiara and speaking with a perfect upper-crust accent. When Bill returns downstairs, Sally conceals her identity; when she reveals it, Bill is relieved and the couple gain the acceptance of the family.

Musical numbers
Based on the 1986 Broadway production

Act 1
A Weekend at Hareford – Ensemble
Thinking of No-One But Me – Lady Jaqueline Carstone and The Hon. Gerald Bolingbroke
The Family Solicitor – Herbert Parchester and The Family
Me and My Girl – Bill Snibson and Sally Smith
An English Gentleman – Charles Hethersett and Staff
You Would If You Could – Lady Jaqueline and Bill
Hold My Hand – Bill, Sally and Dancers
Once You Lose Your Heart – Sally
Preparation Fugue – The Company
The Lambeth Walk – Bill, Sally and The Company

Act 2
The Sun Has Got His Hat On – The Hon. Gerald Bolingbroke, Lady Jaqueline and Ensemble
Take It on the Chin – Sally
Once You Lose Your Heart (Reprise) – Sally
Song of Hareford – Duchess Maria, Bill and Ensemble
Love Makes the World Go Round – Bill and Sir John Tremayne
Leaning on a Lamp-post – Bill and Ensemble
If Only You Had Cared for Me – Sir John and Duchess Maria
Finale – The Company

Characters
Bill Snibson – a cockney costermonger who inherits Lord Hareford's land and titles
Sally Smith – Bill's sweetheart
Sir John Tremayne – an older gentleman, who is kind to Sally and Bill. He is in love with the Duchess
The Duchess of Dene – an intimidating aristocrat.  Bill's Aunt
Gerald Bolingbroke – an attractive young man. He is in love with Jackie
Lady Jacqueline (Jackie) Carstone – breaks off her engagement to Gerald to pursue Bill
Herbert Parchester – the family solicitor
Lord Jasper Tring – an elderly and hard-of-hearing nobleman
Charles – a manservant
Lord and Lady Battersby, Lady Brighton, The Honourable Margaret Aikington, Charles Boulting-Smythe – other members of the family
Mrs Brown – Sally's landlady
Bob Barking – a friend of Bill and Sally

Film adaptation

In 1939, the play was turned into a film directed by Albert de Courville.  Lane reprised his stage role of Snibson. The film took its name from the well-known song and dance.  The film was a largely faithful adaptation of the musical and was commercially successful and popular with critics.

Awards and nominations

London revival 1984

Original Broadway production

References

External links

Synopsis and production information at guidetomusicaltheatre
  The New York Times review, 11 August 1986

West End musicals
Broadway musicals
1937 musicals
Original musicals
Laurence Olivier Award-winning musicals
British musicals
Tony Award-winning musicals